Margaret of Parma (5 July 1522 – 18 January 1586) was Governor of the Netherlands from 1559 to 1567 and from 1578 to 1582. She was the illegitimate daughter of the then 22-year-old Holy Roman Emperor Charles V and Johanna Maria van der Gheynst. She was a Duchess of Florence and a Duchess of Parma and Piacenza by her two marriages.

Biography 

Margaret's mother, Johanna Maria van der Gheynst, a servant of Count Charles de Lalaing, Seigneur de Montigny, was a Fleming. Margaret was brought up in Mechelen, under the supervision of two powerful Spanish and Austrian Habsburg Imperial family relatives, her great-aunt, the Archduchess Margaret of Austria, and her aunt Mary of Austria, who were successive governors of the Netherlands from 1507 to 1530 and from 1530 to 1555, respectively.

Her early life followed a strict routine set forth by her father, Charles V, who used his daughter as part of his plans to secure his empire.

In 1527, the year she turned five, she became engaged to the nephew of Pope Clement VII, Alessandro de' Medici, Duke of Florence, to assist her father's ambition in gaining influence in Italy. The marriage negotiations had been initiated in 1526, and in 1529, the agreement was officially signed by her father and the Pope. In 1529, Margaret was acknowledged by her father and allowed to assume the name Margaret of Austria, and in 1533, the 11-year-old girl was brought to live in Italy and educated in the courts of Florence, Rome, and Parma. There, she was taught skills that helped her grow as an independent woman. As Margaret did not spend much time with her husband, she used this time to become exposed to the surrounding Italian culture. Though she was multi-lingual, she preferred the Italian language for the rest of her life.

On 13 June 1536 in Florence, she married Alessandro, who was assassinated on 6 January 1537. On 4 November 1538 in Rome, the 15-year-old widow married Ottavio Farnese, Duke of Parma, the 14-year-old grandson of Pope Paul III. At first she refused to marry him. Although the union proved an unhappy one, it gave her years of experience in Rome, and produced twin sons, one of whom died in infancy. She would continue her studies of the arts and politics while being married to Ottavio. The couple lived separately for much of their lives, and Margaret maintained her own court and chapel. She was in a somewhat difficult position, as the Pope and the Emperor argued about authority over Parma. In 1555, the Farnese family were acknowledged as rulers of Parma by Spain in exchange for the custody of her son.

In 1555, she left Italy for the Netherlands, where she left her son in the care of her half-brother Philip II. Philip appointed her Governor of the Netherlands when he left in 1559 for Spain. As governor, Margaret faced the rising storm of discontent against the Inquisition and Spanish despotism, and Philip had left her but nominal authority. He was determined to pursue his own arbitrary course, and the result was the revolt of the Netherlands.  Margaret was forced to adjust herself to the advice of Cardinal Granvelle, Philip's choice for her chief councilor, who would grow to be greatly disliked in the Netherlands. After Granvelle's exile from the Netherlands in 1564, Margaret was forced to rely on the grandees in her Council. In 1565, an opposition party was formed from the Dutch nobility. Margaret received its complaints and, having no army to put down the dissenters, promised to stop religious repression. In 1566, Iconoclastic riots took place all over the Netherlands but she managed to quell them, with the help of her stadtholders Philip of Noircarmes (who subjugated the cities of Tournai and Valenciennes) in Hainaut and William of Orange in Holland . The next year, Philip sent her military help led by the Duke of Alba. Margaret warned Philip that actions by Alba would lead to catastrophe, but instead of trying to stop Alba, she resigned when she learned that Alba's power of attorney, granted by Philip, superseded her own.

In 1567, Margaret retired to L'Aquila in Italy. She was appointed Governor of Abruzzo and Viceroy of Naples,where she had inherited a domain from her late husband. She acted as the adviser to her son and to her royal bastard half-brother, John of Austria. In 1578, her son Alexander Farnese was appointed to the office of governor-general of the Netherlands; Philip appointed her his co-regent, intending that they would balance each other. However, they were unable to work together, and Margaret retired to Namur in 1582. She was given permission by Philip to return to Italy in 1583. She died in Ortona in 1586 and was buried in the church of S. Sisto in Piacenza.

Charlie R. Steen describes her as "a woman dedicated to compromise and conciliation in public affairs." 

She personally asked to Pope Paul III to authorize the veneration of the Seven Archangels while Antonio del Duca did the same under the protection of the Colonna family.

Issue 

Margaret and her second husband Ottavio had:
 Charles Farnese (27 August 1545 – September 1545), heir to the Duchy of Parma.
 Alexander Farnese (27 August 1545 – 3 December 1592), 3rd Duke of Parma; married Infanta Maria of Portugal and had issue.

Coat of arms
Margaret of Austria, as Duchess of Florence and Parma, chose for her device a pearl shining from its shell, with the motto, Decus allatura coronae ("About to bring glory to the crown").

Ancestry

See also
 Geuzen

Notes

References

 http://www.inghist.nl/Onderzoek/Projecten/DVN/lemmata/data/Margaretha%20van%20Parma

Governors of the Habsburg Netherlands
House of Farnese
16th-century women rulers
16th-century House of Habsburg
1522 births
1586 deaths
Duchesses of Urbino
Regents of Parma
Italian nobility
Duchesses of Florence
Duchesses of Parma
People from Oudenaarde
Daughters of emperors
Children of Charles V, Holy Roman Emperor
Daughters of kings
Female governors-general